The 1999 New York Mets season was the franchise's 38th season and the team's thirty-sixth season at Shea Stadium.  They went 97–66 and finished 2nd in the NL East but won the NL Wild Card by beating the Cincinnati Reds in a one-game playoff. The Mets advanced to the National League Championship Series, where they were defeated by the Atlanta Braves in 6 games.

The Mets were managed by Bobby Valentine, who entered his fourth year as skipper. They played home games at Shea Stadium.

Offseason
November 11, 1998: Bobby Bonilla was traded by the Los Angeles Dodgers to the New York Mets for Mel Rojas.
December 1, 1998: Todd Hundley was traded by the New York Mets with Arnold Gooch (minors) to the Los Angeles Dodgers for Roger Cedeño and Charles Johnson.
December 1, 1998: Charles Johnson was traded by the New York Mets to the Baltimore Orioles for Armando Benítez.
December 1, 1998: Robin Ventura was signed as a free agent with the New York Mets.
December 16, 1998: Rickey Henderson signed as a free agent with the New York Mets.
December 18, 1998: Josías Manzanillo was signed as a free agent with the New York Mets.

Regular season
The Mets' 97 victories were their highest total since they won 100 games in 1988. They were led offensively by catcher Mike Piazza, who compiled a .303 average with 40 home runs and 124 RBI in his first full season with the team. New third baseman Robin Ventura put together a .301 average, 32 home runs, and 120 RBI while second baseman Edgardo Alfonzo hit .304 with 27 home runs and 108 RBI. First baseman John Olerud continued his consistent hitting, hitting .298 with 96 RBI, his third straight year with 90 or more runs driven in. Offseason acquisitions Roger Cedeño and Rickey Henderson recorded the two highest batting averages on the squad at .315 and .313 respectively. Benny Agbayani, a semi-regular outfielder who got more playing time as the year progressed, contributed 14 home runs.

The Mets' pitching staff was again led by Al Leiter with 13 wins. Orel Hershiser matched that total, with Masato Yoshii recording 12 wins and Rick Reed 11. Rookie Octavio Dotel went 8-3 in fourteen starts, and late season acquisition Kenny Rogers won five of six decisions while leading the team in complete games. The rotation was not as strong as keeping runs off the board; the team's four main starters recorded ERAs above 4.00.

The offseason acquisition of Armando Benitez from the Baltimore Orioles ended John Franco's tenure as the team's closer. Franco did manage to record nineteen saves and broke the Major League Baseball record for saves by a left-hander, but Benitez' 1.85 ERA and twenty-two saves ensured the closer role would be his for the foreseeable future.

Mercury Mets
As part of the now-infamous Turn Ahead the Clock promotion sponsored by Century 21, the Mets changed their name to the "Mercury Mets" while hosting the Pittsburgh Pirates on July 27, 1999.

Opening Day starters
SP – Al Leiter
C – Mike Piazza
1B – John Olerud
2B – Edgardo Alfonzo
3B – Robin Ventura
SS – Rey Ordóñez
LF – Rickey Henderson
CF – Brian McRae
RF – Bobby Bonilla

Season standings

Record vs. opponents

Notable transactions
 July 31, 1999: Brian McRae was traded by the New York Mets with Thomas Johnson (minors) and Rigo Beltrán to the Colorado Rockies for Darryl Hamilton and Chuck McElroy.
July 31, 1999: Jason Isringhausen was traded by the New York Mets with Greg McMichael to the Oakland Athletics for Billy Taylor.

Game log 

|- bgcolor="#fcc"
| 1 || April 5 || @ Marlins || 2–6 || Fernandez (1–0) || Leiter (0–1) || — || Pro Player Stadium || 38,983 || 0–1
|- bgcolor="#cfc"
| 2 || April 6 || @ Marlins || 12–3 || Reed (1–0) || Hernandez (0–1) || Watson (1) || Pro Player Stadium || 18,075 || 1–1
|- bgcolor="#cfc"
| 3 || April 7 || @ Marlins || 6–0 || Jones (1–0) || Sanchez (0–1) || — || Pro Player Stadium || 13,845 || 2–1
|- bgcolor="#fcc"
| 4 || April 8 || @ Expos || 1–5 || Batista (1–0) || Hershiser (0–1) || Urbina (1) || Olympic Stadium || 43,918 || 2–2
|- bgcolor="#cfc"
| 5 || April 9 || @ Expos || 10–3 || Yoshii (1–0) || Thurman (0–1) || — || Olympic Stadium || 12,386 || 3–2
|- bgcolor="#cfc"
| 6 || April 10 || @ Expos || 4–3  || Cook (1–0) || Telford (0–1) || Franco (1) || Olympic Stadium || 16,173 || 4–2
|- bgcolor="#cfc"
| 7 || April 11 || @ Expos || 6–3 || Watson (1–0) || Pavano (0–2) || Franco (2) || Olympic Stadium || 10,366 || 5–2
|- bgcolor="#cfc"
| 8 || April 12 || Marlins || 8–1 || Jones (2–0) || Hernandez (0–2) || — || Shea Stadium || 52,052 || 6–2
|- bgcolor="#cfc"
| 9 || April 14 || Marlins || 4–1 || Hershiser (1–1) || Sanchez (0–2) || Franco (3) || Shea Stadium || 15,729 || 7–2
|- bgcolor="#fcc"
| 10 || April 15 || Marlins || 4–11 || Meadows (2–0) || Yoshii (1–1) || — || Shea Stadium || 14,165 || 7–3
|- bgcolor="#fcc"
| 11 || April 16 || Expos || 4–6 || Hermanson (2–0) || Leiter (0–2) || Urbina (2) || Shea Stadium || 17,900 || 7–4
|- bgcolor="#cfc"
| 12 || April 17 || Expos || 3–2 || Jones (3–0) || Pavano (0–3) || Franco (4) || Shea Stadium || 34,784 || 8–4
|- bgcolor="#fcc"
| 13 || April 18 || Expos || 2–4 || Vazquez (1–1) || Watson (1–1) || Urbina (3) || Shea Stadium || 26,020 || 8–5
|- bgcolor="#cfc"
| 14 || April 20 || @ Reds || 3–2 || Cook (2–0) || Harnisch (1–2) || Franco (5) || Cinergy Field || 14,006 || 9–5
|- bgcolor="#fcc"
| 15 || April 21 || @ Reds || 4–7 || Sullivan (1–0) || Yoshii (1–2) || Graves (2) || Cinergy Field || 15,040 || 9–6
|- bgcolor="#cfc"
| 16 || April 22 || @ Reds || 4–1 || Leiter (1–2) || Tomko (0–1) || Franco (6) || Cinergy Field || 14,783 || 10–6
|- bgcolor="#cfc"
| 17 || April 23 || @ Cubs || 6–5 || Cook (3–0) || Beck (1–2) || Franco (7) || Wrigley Field || 20,828 || 11–6
|- bgcolor="#fcc"
| 18 || April 24 || @ Cubs || 0–2 || Mulholland (1–0) || Watson (1–2) || Beck (3) || Wrigley Field || 38,516 || 11–7
|- bgcolor="#fcc"
| 19 || April 25 || @ Cubs || 4–8 || Myers (1–0) || Hershiser (1–2) || — || Wrigley Field || 39,265 || 11–8
|- bgcolor="#fcc"
| 20 || April 27 || Padres || 2–6 || Ashby (4–1) || Yoshii (1–3) || — || Shea Stadium || 25,113 || 11–9
|- bgcolor="#cfc"
| 21 || April 28 || Padres || 4–3 || Wendell (1–0) || Hoffman (0–2) || — || Shea Stadium || 22,581 || 12–9
|- bgcolor="#cfc"
| 22 || April 29 || Padres || 8–5 || Cook (4–0) || Boehringer (0–1) || Franco (8) || Shea Stadium || 18,442 || 13–9
|- bgcolor="#cfc"
| 23 || April 30 || Giants || 7–2 || Watson (2–2) || Estes (2–2) || Wendell (1) || Shea Stadium || 32,427 || 14–9
|-

|- bgcolor="#cfc"
| 24 || May 1 || Giants || 9–4 || Hershiser (2–2) || Brock (2–2) || — || Shea Stadium || 33,825 || 15–9
|- bgcolor="#cfc"
| 25 || May 2 || Giants || 2–0 || Cook (5–0) || Johnstone (3–1) || Franco (9) || Shea Stadium || 37,431 || 16–9
|- bgcolor="#cfc"
| 26 || May 3 || Astros || 5–3 || Reed (2–0) || Holt (0–4) || Franco (10) || Shea Stadium || 14,878 || 17–9
|- bgcolor="#fcc"
| 27 || May 4 || Astros || 1–6 || Hampton (3–1) || Leiter (1–3) || — || Shea Stadium || 27,192 || 17–10
|- bgcolor="#fcc"
| 28 || May 5 || Astros || 4–5 || Powell (2–0) || Benitez (0–1) || Wagner (10) || Shea Stadium || 25,026 || 17–11
|- bgcolor="#fcc"
| 29 || May 7 || @ Diamondbacks || 7–14 || Stottlemyre (4–1) || Hershiser (2–3) || — || Bank One Ballpark || 38,154 || 17–12
|- bgcolor="#cfc"
| 30 || May 8 || @ Diamondbacks || 4–2 || Yoshii (2–3) || Benes (2–3) || Benitez (1) || Bank One Ballpark || 37,593 || 18–12
|- bgcolor="#fcc"
| 31 || May 9 || @ Diamondbacks || 6–11 || Daal (3–3) || Reed (2–1) || — || Bank One Ballpark || 38,250 || 18–13
|- bgcolor="#fcc"
| 32 || May 10 || @ Rockies || 3–10 || Astacio (3–3) || Leiter (1–4) || — || Coors Field || 40,021 || 18–14
|- bgcolor="#fcc"
| 33 || May 11 || @ Rockies || 5–8 || B. M. Jones (1–1) || B. J. Jones (3–1) || — || Coors Field || 40,032 || 18–15
|- bgcolor="#cfc"
| 34 || May 12 || @ Rockies || 10–5 || Reed (3–1) || Thomson (0–5) || — || Coors Field || 41,011 || 19–15
|- bgcolor="#cfc"
| 35 || May 14 || @ Phillies || 7–3 || Yoshii (3–3) || Ogea (2–3) || — || Veterans Stadium || 21,074 || 20–15
|- bgcolor="#cfc"
| 36 || May 15 || @ Phillies || 9–7 || Mahomes (1–0) || Ryan (1–2) || Franco (11) || Veterans Stadium || 27,039 || 21–15
|- bgcolor="#fcc"
| 37 || May 16 || @ Phillies || 2–5 || Byrd (5–2) || Hershiser (2–4) || Brantley (5) || Veterans Stadium || 28,422 || 21–16
|- bgcolor="#fcc"
| 38 || May 17 || Brewers || 6–7 || Karl (5–1) || B. J. Jones (3–2) || Wickman (8) || Shea Stadium || 16,326 || 21–17
|- bgcolor="#fcc"
| 39 || May 18 || Brewers || 2–4 || Weathers (3–0) || Cook (5–1) || Wickman (9) || Shea Stadium || 26,411 || 21–18
|- bgcolor="#ccc"
| – || May 19 || Brewers || colspan=8|Postponed (rain); rescheduled for May 20
|- bgcolor="#cfc"
| 40 || May 20  || Brewers || 11–10 || Leiter (2–4) || Abbott (0–5) || Franco (12) || Shea Stadium || N/A || 22–18
|- bgcolor="#cfc"
| 41 || May 20  || Brewers || 7–5 || Yoshii (4–3) || Woodard (3–4) || — || Shea Stadium || 19,542 || 23–18
|- bgcolor="#cfc"
| 42 || May 21 || Phillies || 7–5 || Hershiser (3–4) || Loewer (2–4) || Franco (13) || Shea Stadium || 24,554 || 24–18
|- bgcolor="#fcc"
| 43 || May 22 || Phillies || 3–9 || Byrd (6–2) || B. J. Jones (3–3) || — || Shea Stadium || 34,575 || 24–19
|- bgcolor="#cfc"
| 44 || May 23 || Phillies || 5–4 || Beltran (1–0) || Schilling (7–2) || — || Shea Stadium || 34,950 || 25–19
|- bgcolor="#fcc"
| 45 || May 24 || @ Pirates || 4–7 || Silva (2–2) || Isringhausen (0–1) || Williams (8) || Three Rivers Stadium || 11,880 || 25–20
|- bgcolor="#cfc"
| 46 || May 25 || @ Pirates || 8–3 || Yoshii (5–3) || Benson (3–3) || — || Three Rivers Stadium || 12,029 || 26–20
|- bgcolor="#cfc"
| 47 || May 26 || @ Pirates || 5–2 || Hershiser (4–4) || Schourek (2–5) || Franco (14) || Three Rivers Stadium || 13,681 || 27–20
|- bgcolor="#fcc"
| 48 || May 28 || Diamondbacks || 1–2 || Daal (5–4) || Reed (3–2) || Olson (6) || Shea Stadium || 32,114 || 27–21
|- bgcolor="#fcc"
| 49 || May 29 || Diamondbacks || 7–8 || Reynoso (3–1) || Beltran (1–1) || Kim (1) || Shea Stadium || 35,167 || 27–22
|- bgcolor="#fcc"
| 50 || May 30 || Diamondbacks || 1–10 || Johnson (6–2) || Yoshii (5–4) || — || Shea Stadium || 38,302 || 27–23
|- bgcolor="#fcc"
| 51 || May 31 || Reds || 3–5 || Villone (1–0) || Leiter (2–5) || Williamson (6) || Shea Stadium || 28,368 || 27–24
|-

|- bgcolor="#fcc"
| 52 || June 1 || Reds || 0–4 || Harnisch (5–5) || Hershiser (4–5) || — || Shea Stadium || 17,899 || 27–25
|- bgcolor="#fcc"
| 53 || June 2 || Reds || 7–8 || Williamson (4–1) || Franco (0–1) || Sullivan (1) || Shea Stadium || 15,837 || 27–26
|- bgcolor="#fcc"
| 54 || June 4 || @ Yankees || 3–4 || Grimsley (5–0) || Reed (3–3) || Rivera (14) || Yankee Stadium || 56,175 || 27–27
|- bgcolor="#fcc"
| 55 || June 5 || @ Yankees || 3–6 || Hernandez (6–5) || Yoshii (5–5) || Rivera (15) || Yankee Stadium || 55,935 || 27–28
|- bgcolor="#cfc"
| 56 || June 6 || @ Yankees || 7–2 || Leiter (3–5) || Clemens (5–1) || — || Yankee Stadium || 56,294 || 28–28
|- bgcolor="#cfc"
| 57 || June 7 || Blue Jays || 8–2 || Hershiser (5–5) || Halladay (4–3) || — || Shea Stadium || 21,457 || 29–28
|- bgcolor="#cfc"
| 58 || June 8 || Blue Jays || 11–3 || Isringhausen (1–1) || Hentgen (4–5) || — || Shea Stadium || 18,984 || 30–28
|- bgcolor="#cfc"
| 59 || June 9 || Blue Jays || 4–3  || Mahomes (2–0) || Davey (1–1) || — || Shea Stadium || 18,254 || 31–28
|- bgcolor="#fcc"
| 60 || June 11 || Red Sox || 2–3  || Corsi (1–2) || Franco (0–2) || Wasdin (1) || Shea Stadium || 36,700 || 31–29
|- bgcolor="#cfc"
| 61 || June 12 || Red Sox || 4–2 || Leiter (4–5) || Rapp (2–4) || Franco (15) || Shea Stadium || 43,819 || 32–29
|- bgcolor="#cfc"
| 62 || June 13 || Red Sox || 5–4 || Hershiser (6–5) || Portugal (3–5) || Wendell (2) || Shea Stadium || 46,473 || 33–29
|- bgcolor="#fcc"
| 63 || June 14 || @ Reds || 4–8 || Williamson (6–2) || McMichael (0–1) || — || Cinergy Field || 19,270 || 33–30
|- bgcolor="#cfc"
| 64 || June 15 || @ Reds || 11–3 || Reed (4–3) || Tomko (2–4) || — || Cinergy Field || 18,248 || 34–30
|- bgcolor="#cfc"
| 65 || June 16 || @ Reds || 5–2 || Yoshii (6–5) || Parris (4–1) || Franco (16) || Cinergy Field || 25,531 || 35–30
|- bgcolor="#cfc"
| 66 || June 17 || @ Cardinals || 4–3 || Leiter (5–5) || Mercker (2–3) || Cook (1) || Busch Stadium || 37,601 || 36–30
|- bgcolor="#cfc"
| 67 || June 18 || @ Cardinals || 6–2 || Hershiser (7–5) || Acevedo (4–2) || Benitez (2) || Busch Stadium || 47,191 || 37–30
|- bgcolor="#fcc"
| 68 || June 19 || @ Cardinals || 6–7 || Aybar (3–1) || Isringhausen (1–2) || Bottalico (9) || Busch Stadium || 47,638 || 37–31
|- bgcolor="#cfc"
| 69 || June 20 || @ Cardinals || 9–6 || Reed (5–3) || Croushore (1–1) || Franco (17) || Busch Stadium || 44,705 || 38–31
|- bgcolor="#cfc"
| 70 || June 22 || Marlins || 8–2 || McMichael (1–1) || Springer (2–9) || Benitez (3) || Shea Stadium || 30,713 || 39–31
|- bgcolor="#cfc"
| 71 || June 23 || Marlins || 6–3 || Leiter (6–5) || Meadows (5–8) || Franco (18) || Shea Stadium || 25,116 || 40–31
|- bgcolor="#cfc"
| 72 || June 24 || Marlins || 3–2 || Cook (6–1) || Hernandez (3–7) || Franco (19) || Shea Stadium || 29,567 || 41–31
|- bgcolor="#cfc"
| 73 || June 25 || @ Braves || 10–2 || Reed (6–3) || Perez (4–5) || — || Turner Field || 48,292 || 42–31
|- bgcolor="#fcc"
| 74 || June 26 || @ Braves || 2–7 || Glavine (6–7) || Dotel (0–1) || — || Turner Field || 48,293 || 42–32
|- bgcolor="#fcc"
| 75 || June 27 || @ Braves || 0–1 || Maddux (7–5) || Yoshii (6–6) || Rocker (16) || Turner Field || 46,092 || 42–33
|- bgcolor="#cfc"
| 76 || June 28 || @ Marlins || 10–4 || Leiter (7–5) || Meadows (5–9) || — || Pro Player Stadium || 12,444 || 43–33
|- bgcolor="#cfc"
| 77 || June 29 || @ Marlins || 5–1 || Hershiser (8–5) || Hernandez (3–8) || — || Pro Player Stadium || 11,256 || 44–33
|- bgcolor="#fcc"
| 78 || June 30 || @ Marlins || 3–4  || Alfonseca (4–4) || Benitez (0–2) || — || Pro Player Stadium || 16,660 || 44–34
|-

|- bgcolor="#cfc"
| 79 || July 1 || @ Marlins || 12–8 || Dotel (1–1) || Dempster (4–4) || — || Pro Player Stadium || 10,884 || 45–34
|- bgcolor="#fcc"
| 80 || July 2 || Braves || 0–16 || Maddux (8–5) || Yoshii (6–7) || — || Shea Stadium || 51,979 || 45–35
|- bgcolor="#fcc"
| 81 || July 3 || Braves || 0–3 || Millwood (10–4) || Leiter (7–6) || Rocker (17) || Shea Stadium || 43,256 || 45–36
|- bgcolor="#cfc"
| 82 || July 4 || Braves || 7–6 || Cook (7–1) || Smoltz (8–3) || Benitez (4) || Shea Stadium || 32,699 || 46–36
|- bgcolor="#cfc"
| 83 || July 5 || Expos || 2–1 || Wendell (2–0) || Mota (1–3) || Benitez (5) || Shea Stadium || 22,699 || 47–36
|- bgcolor="#cfc"
| 84 || July 6 || Expos || 10–0 || Hershiser (9–5) || Pavano (6–7) || Isringhausen (1) || Shea Stadium || 30,053 || 48–36
|- bgcolor="#fcc"
| 85 || July 7 || Expos || 1–3 || Kline (3–2) || Wendell (2–1) || Urbina (18) || Shea Stadium || 26,457 || 48–37
|- bgcolor="#fcc"
| 86 || July 8 || Expos || 3–4 || Ayala (1–5) || Cook (7–2) || Urbina (19) || Shea Stadium || 29,730 || 48–38
|- bgcolor="#cfc"
| 87 || July 9 || Yankees || 5–2 || Leiter (8–6) || Clemens (8–3) || Benitez (6) || Shea Stadium || 53,820 || 49–38
|- bgcolor="#cfc" 
| 88 || July 10 || Yankees || 9–8 || Mahomes (3–0) || Rivera (2–2) || — || Shea Stadium || 53,792 || 50–38
|- bgcolor="#fcc"
| 89 || July 11 || Yankees || 3–6 || Irabu (6–3) || Hershiser (9–6) || Rivera (23) || Shea Stadium || 53,869 || 50–39
|- bgcolor="#bbcaff" 
| colspan=10 | 70th All-Star Game in Boston, Massachusetts
|- bgcolor="#cfc"
| 90 || July 15 || @ Devil Rays || 8–7  || Benitez (1–2) || Charlton (0–2) || — || Tropicana Field || 19,384 || 51–39
|- bgcolor="#cfc"
| 91 || July 16 || @ Devil Rays || 9–7 || Reed (7–3) || Eiland (1–5) || Cook (2) || Tropicana Field || 20,929 || 52–39
|- bgcolor="#fcc"
| 92 || July 17 || @ Devil Rays || 2–3 || Alvarez (5–6) || Hershiser (9–7) || Hernandez (27) || Tropicana Field || 36,994 || 52–40
|- bgcolor="#cfc"
| 93 || July 18 || @ Orioles || 8–6 || Yoshii (7–7) || Guzman (4–8) || Benitez (7) || Oriole Park at Camden Yards || 47,480 || 53–40
|- bgcolor="#cfc"
| 94 || July 19 || @ Orioles || 4–1 || Dotel (2–1) || Johnson (1–4) || Benitez (8) || Oriole Park at Camden Yards || 42,615 || 54–40
|- bgcolor="#fcc"
| 95 || July 20 || @ Orioles || 1–4 || Ponson (9–6) || Leiter (8–7) || — || Oriole Park at Camden Yards || 45,450 || 54–41
|- bgcolor="#cfc"
| 96 || July 21 || @ Expos || 7–3 || Reed (8–3) || Smith (1–5)  || — || Olympic Stadium || 8,676 || 55–41
|- bgcolor="#cfc"
| 97 || July 22 || @ Expos || 7–4 || Hershiser (10–7) || Hermanson (3–9) || — || Olympic Stadium || 8,044 || 56–41
|- bgcolor="#cfc"
| 98 || July 23 || Cubs || 5–4 || Cook (8–2) || Tapani (6–7) || Benitez (9) || Shea Stadium || 52,135 || 57–41
|- bgcolor="#cfc"
| 99 || July 24 || Cubs || 2–1 || Dotel (3–1) || Trachsel (3–14) || Benitez (10) || Shea Stadium || 47,995 || 58–41
|- bgcolor="#cfc"
| 100 || July 25 || Cubs || 5–1 || Leiter (9–7) || Serafini (2–2) || — || Shea Stadium || 47,679 || 59–41
|- bgcolor="#cfc"
| 101 || July 26 || Pirates || 7–5 || Reed (9–3) || Cordova (5–5) || Wendell (3) || Shea Stadium || 32,010 || 60–41
|- bgcolor="#fcc"
| 102 || July 27 || Pirates || 1–5 || Benson (8–8) || Hershiser (10–8) || — || Shea Stadium || 36,337 || 60–42
|- bgcolor="#cfc"
| 103 || July 28 || Pirates || 9–2 || Cook (9–2) || Wilkins (2–1) || — || Shea Stadium || 42,920 || 61–42
|- bgcolor="#cfc"
| 104 || July 30 || @ Cubs || 10–9 || Mahomes (4–0) || Farnsworth (2–4) || Benitez (11) || Wrigley Field || 38,594 || 62–42
|- bgcolor="#fcc"
| 105 || July 31 || @ Cubs || 10–17 || Serafini (3–2) || Isringhausen (1–3) || — || Wrigley Field || 39,431 || 62–43
|-

|- bgcolor="#cfc"
| 106 || August 1 || @ Cubs || 5–4  || Mahomes (5–0) || Sanders (4–5) || — || Wrigley Field || 39,222 || 63–43
|- bgcolor="#cfc"
| 107 || August 2 || @ Brewers || 7–2 || Reed (10–3) || Nomo (9–4) || — || County Stadium || 19,626 || 64–43
|- bgcolor="#cfc"
| 108 || August 3 || @ Brewers || 10–3 || Hershiser (11–8) || Pulsipher (3–2) || — || County Stadium || 17,669 || 65–43
|- bgcolor="#cfc"
| 109 || August 4 || @ Brewers || 9–5 || Rogers (6–3) || Peterson (1–2) || — || County Stadium || 20,762 || 66–43
|- bgcolor="#cfc"
| 110 || August 6 || Dodgers || 2–1 || Dotel (4–1) || Park (6–9) || Benitez (12) || Shea Stadium || 43,825 || 67–43
|- bgcolor="#fcc"
| 111 || August 7 || Dodgers || 6–7 || Borbon (3–1) || Taylor (1–6) || Shaw (23) || Shea Stadium || 53,656 || 67–44
|- bgcolor="#fcc"
| 112 || August 8 || Dodgers || 3–14 || Dreifort (9–11) || Reed (10–4) || — || Shea Stadium || 39,803 || 67–45
|- bgcolor="#fcc"
| 113 || August 9 || Dodgers || 2–9 || Brown (13–6) || Hershiser (11–9) || — || Shea Stadium || 36,345 || 67–46
|- bgcolor="#cfc"
| 114 || August 10 || Padres || 4–3 || Wendell (3–1) || Ashby (10–6) || Benitez (13) || Shea Stadium || 32,101 || 68–46
|- bgcolor="#cfc"
| 115 || August 11 || Padres || 12–5 || Mahomes (6–0) || Hitchcock (11–9) || — || Shea Stadium || 34,232 || 69–46
|- bgcolor="#cfc"
| 116 || August 12 || Padres || 9–3 || Leiter (10–7) || Williams (5–11) || — || Shea Stadium || 32,062 || 70–46
|- bgcolor="#fcc"
| 117 || August 13 || @ Giants || 2–3 || Ortiz (13–8) || Yoshii (7–8) || Nen (26) || 3Com Park || 25,533 || 70–47
|- bgcolor="#cfc"
| 118 || August 14 || @ Giants || 6–1 || Hershiser (12–9) || Reuter (10–7) || — || 3Com Park || 57,853 || 71–47
|- bgcolor="#cfc"
| 119 || August 15 || @ Giants || 12–5 || Rogers (7–3) || Hernandez (6–11) || — || 3Com Park || 41,530 || 72–47
|- bgcolor="#cfc"
| 120 || August 16 || @ Padres || 4–3  || Cook (10–2) || Cunnane (2–1) || Benitez (14) || Qualcomm Stadium || 21,974 || 73–47
|- bgcolor="#fcc"
| 121 || August 17 || @ Padres || 2–3 || Williams (6–11) || Leiter (10–8) || Hoffman (31) || Qualcomm Stadium || 22,790 || 73–48
|- bgcolor="#cfc"
| 122 || August 18 || @ Padres || 9–1 || Yoshii (8–8) || Spencer (0–6) || — || Qualcomm Stadium || 24,519 || 74–48
|- bgcolor="#ccc"
| – || August 20 || Cardinals || colspan=8|Postponed (rain); rescheduled for August 22
|- bgcolor="#cfc"
| 123 || August 21 || Cardinals || 7–4 || Mahomes (7–0) || Mercker (6–5) || Benitez (15) || Shea Stadium || 45,491 || 75–48
|- bgcolor="#cfc"
| 124 || August 22  || Cardinals || 8–7 || Benitez (2–2) || Bottalico (2–7) || — || Shea Stadium || N/A || 76–48
|- bgcolor="#fcc"
| 125 || August 22  || Cardinals || 5–7 || Stephenson (4–0) || Hershiser (12–10) || Acevedo (4) || Shea Stadium || 50,139 || 76–49
|- bgcolor="#cfc"
| 126 || August 23 || Astros || 3–2 || Benitez (3–2) || Powell (4–4) || — || Shea Stadium || 39,292 || 77–49
|- bgcolor="#fcc"
| 127 || August 24 || Astros || 1–5  || Wagner (3–1) || Cook (10–3) || — || Shea Stadium || 35,673 || 77–50
|- bgcolor="#cfc"
| 128 || August 25 || Astros || 4–0 || Rogers (8–3) || Reynolds (14–10) || Cook (3) || Shea Stadium || 44,640 || 78–50
|- bgcolor="#cfc"
| 129 || August 27 || @ Diamondbacks || 6–3 || Dotel (5–1) || Daal (13–7) || Benitez (16) || Bank One Ballpark || 42,581 || 79–50
|- bgcolor="#fcc"
| 130 || August 28 || @ Diamondbacks || 3–5 || Reynoso (10–2) || Cook (10–4) || Mantei (24) || Bank One Ballpark || 47,076 || 79–51
|- bgcolor="#fcc"
| 131 || August 29 || @ Diamondbacks || 4–8 || Anderson (6–2) || Leiter (10–9) || Olson (14) || Bank One Ballpark || 38,596 || 79–52
|- bgcolor="#cfc"
| 132 || August 30 || @ Astros || 17–1 || Yoshii (9–8) || Reynolds (14–11) || — || Astrodome || 28,032 || 80–52
|- bgcolor="#fcc"
| 133 || August 31 || @ Astros || 2–6 || Lima (18–7) || Wendell (3–2) || — || Astrodome || 24,982 || 80–53
|-

|- bgcolor="#cfc"
| 134 || September 1 || @ Astros || 9–5 || Dotel (6–1) || Holt (3–13) || — || Astrodome || 24,112 || 81–53
|- bgcolor="#fcc"
| 135 || September 3 || Rockies || 2–5  || Leskanic (5–2) || Wendell (3–3) || Veres (27) || Shea Stadium || 36,102 || 81–54
|- bgcolor="#cfc"
| 136 || September 4 || Rockies || 4–2 || Leiter (11–9) || Bohanon (11–11) || Benitez (17) || Shea Stadium || 43,431 || 82–54
|- bgcolor="#cfc"
| 137 || September 5 || Rockies || 6–2 || Yoshii (10–8) || Kile (8–13) || — || Shea Stadium || 49,117 || 83–54
|- bgcolor="#cfc"
| 138 || September 6 || Giants || 3–0 || Rogers (9–3) || Gardner (4–10) || — || Shea Stadium || 35,727 || 84–54
|- bgcolor="#fcc"
| 139 || September 7 || Giants || 4–7 || Rodriguez (3–0) || Wendell (3–4) || Nen (32) || Shea Stadium || 24,002 || 84–55
|- bgcolor="#cfc"
| 140 || September 8 || Giants || 7–5 || Dotel (7–1) || Estes (10–8) || Benitez (18) || Shea Stadium || 26,499 || 85–55
|- bgcolor="#cfc"
| 141 || September 9 || @ Dodgers || 3–1 || Hershiser (13–10) || Brown (16–7) || Benitez (19) || Dodger Stadium || 33,954 || 86–55
|- bgcolor="#fcc"
| 142 || September 10 || @ Dodgers || 1–3 || Dreifort (13–13) || Leiter (11–10) || Shaw (32) || Dodger Stadium || 34,414 || 86–56
|- bgcolor="#cfc"
| 143 || September 11 || @ Dodgers || 6–2 || Yoshii (11–8) || Valdez (9–14) || — || Dodger Stadium || 47,747 || 87–56
|- bgcolor="#cfc"
| 144 || September 12 || @ Dodgers || 10–3 || Rogers (10–3) || Gagne (0–1) || — || Dodger Stadium || 34,685 || 88–56
|- bgcolor="#cfc"
| 145 || September 13 || @ Rockies || 6–5 || Wendell (4–4) || Veres (3–8) || Benitez (20) || Coors Field || 40,547 || 89–56
|- bgcolor="#fcc"
| 146 || September 14 || @ Rockies || 2–7 || Wright (3–2) || Dotel (7–2) || — || Coors Field || 41,090 || 89–57
|- bgcolor="#cfc"
| 147 || September 15 || @ Rockies || 10–5 || Wendell (5–4) || Dipoto (4–5) || Benitez (21) || Coors Field || 41,820 || 90–57
|- bgcolor="#fcc"
| 148 || September 17 || Phillies || 5–8 || Wolf (6–8) || Leiter (11–11) || Brewer (2) || Shea Stadium || 31,842 || 90–58
|- bgcolor="#cfc"
| 149 || September 18 || Phillies || 11–1 || Yoshii (12–8) || Grace (1–3)  || — || Shea Stadium || 37,655 || 91–58
|- bgcolor="#cfc"
| 150 || September 19 || Phillies || 8–6 || Dotel (8–2) || Byrd (14–10) || Benitez (22) || Shea Stadium || 51,560 || 92–58
|- bgcolor="#fcc"
| 151 || September 21 || @ Braves || 1–2 || Remlinger (10–1) || Cook (10–5) || Rocker (34) || Turner Field || 43,948 || 92–59
|- bgcolor="#fcc"
| 152 || September 22 || @ Braves || 2–5 || Glavine (12–11) || Hershiser (13–11) || Rocker (35) || Turner Field || 47,520 || 92–60
|- bgcolor="#fcc"
| 153 || September 23 || @ Braves || 3–6 || Maddux (19–8) || Leiter (11–12) || Rocker (36) || Turner Field || 49,228 || 92–61
|- bgcolor="#fcc"
| 154 || September 24 || @ Phillies || 2–3 || Grahe (1–3) || Benitez (3–3) || Aldred (1) || Veterans Stadium || 21,649 || 92–62
|- bgcolor="#fcc"
| 155 || September 25 || @ Phillies || 2–4 || Person (9–7) || Rogers (10–4) || Gomes (19) || Veterans Stadium || 23,319 || 92–63
|- bgcolor="#fcc"
| 156 || September 26 || @ Phillies || 2–3 || Byrd (15–10) || Reed (10–5) || Montgomery (1) || Veterans Stadium || 26,370 || 92–64
|- bgcolor="#fcc"
| 157 || September 28 || Braves || 3–9 || Glavine (13–11) || Hershiser (13–12) || — || Shea Stadium || 43,888 || 92–65
|- bgcolor="#cfc"
| 158 || September 29 || Braves || 9–2 || Leiter (12–12) || Maddux (19–9) || — || Shea Stadium || 43,922 || 93–65
|- bgcolor="#fcc"
| 159 || September 30 || Braves || 3–4  || Mulholland (10–8) || Dotel (8–3) || — || Shea Stadium || 48,364 || 93–66
|-

|- bgcolor="#cfc"
| 160 || October 1 || Pirates || 3–2  || Mahomes (8–0) || Sauerbeck (4–1) || — || Shea Stadium || 29,528 || 94–66
|- bgcolor="#cfc"
| 161 || October 2 || Pirates || 7–0 || Reed (11–5) || Cordova (8–10) || — || Shea Stadium || 36,878 || 95–66
|- bgcolor="#cfc"
| 162 || October 3 || Pirates || 2–1 || Benitez (4–3) || Hansell (1–3) || — || Shea Stadium || 50,111 || 96–66
|- bgcolor="#cfc"
| 163 || October 4 || @ Reds || 5–0 || Leiter (13–12) || Parris (11–4) || — || Cinergy Field || 54,621 || 97–66
|-

Roster

Player stats

Batting

Starters by position
Note: Pos = Position; G = Games played; AB = At bats; H = Hits; Avg. = Batting average; HR = Home runs; RBI = Runs batted in
1999 New York Mets Statistics and Roster Baseball-Reference.com

Other batters
Note: G = Games played; AB = At bats; H = Hits; Avg. = Batting average; HR = Home runs; RBI = Runs batted in

Pitching

Starting pitchers
Note: G = Games pitched; GS = Games started; IP = Innings pitched; W = Wins; L = Losses; ERA = Earned run average; SO = Strikeouts

Other pitchers
Note: G = Games pitched; IP = Innings pitched; W = Wins; L = Losses; ERA = Earned run average; SO = Strikeouts

Relief pitchers
Note: G = Games pitched; IP = Innings pitched; W = Wins; L = Losses; SV = Saves; ERA = Earned run average; SO = Strikeouts

 Postseason 
 Game log 

|- bgcolor=#cfc
| 1 || October 5 || @ Diamondbacks || 8–4 || Wendell (1–0) || Johnson (0–1) || — || Bank One Ballpark || 49,584 || 1–0
|- bgcolor=#fcc
| 2 || October 6 || @ Diamondbacks || 1–7 || Stottlemyre (1–0) || Rogers (0–1) || — || Bank One Ballpark || 49,328 || 1–1
|- bgcolor=#cfc
| 3 || October 8 || Diamondbacks || 9–2 || Reed (1–0) || Daal (0–1) || — || Shea Stadium || 56,180 || 2–1
|- bgcolor=#cfc
| 4 || October 9 || Diamondbacks || 4–3  || Franco (1–0) || Mantei (0–1) || — || Shea Stadium || 56,177 || 3–1
|-

|- bgcolor=#fcc
| 1 || October 12 || @ Braves || 2–4 || Maddux (1–0) || Yoshii (0–1) || Rocker (1) || Turner Field || 44,172 || 0–1
|- bgcolor=#fcc
| 2 || October 13 || @ Braves || 3–4 || Millwood (1–0) || Rogers (0–1) || Smoltz (1) || Turner Field || 44,624 || 0–2
|- bgcolor=#fcc
| 3 || October 15 || Braves || 0–1 || Glavine (1–0) || Leiter (0–1) || Rocker (2) || Shea Stadium || 55,911 || 0–3
|- bgcolor=#cfc
| 4 || October 16 || Braves || 3–2 || Wendell (1–0) || Remlinger (0–1) || Benitez (1) || Shea Stadium || 55,872 || 1–3
|- bgcolor=#cfc
| 5 || October 17 || Braves || 4–3  || Dotel (1–0) || McGlinchy (0–1) || — || Shea Stadium || 55,723 || 2–3
|- bgcolor=#fcc
| 6 || October 19 || @ Braves || 9–10  || Springer (1–0) || Rogers''' (0–2) || — || Turner Field || 52,335 || 2–4
|-

Farm system

References

External links
1999 New York Mets at Baseball Reference
1999 New York Mets team page at www.baseball-almanac.com

New York Mets seasons
New York Mets
New York Mets
1990s in Queens